Nan Marriott-Watson was a British character actress and Broadway theatre performer born 31 August 1899 in West Derby, Lancashire. A character actress in the 1950s, 60s and '70s, she played the famous character of Doris Archer in The Archers from 1 January 1951. She also took part as Ena Sharples in the second unaired pilot of Coronation Street in 1960. She died on 28 August 1982 in Puttenham, Surrey.

References

External links

 Photos at the National Portrait Gallery, taken by Bassano's studio

English television actresses
English film actresses
1982 deaths
Year of birth missing
20th-century English actresses